South Asian Management Technologies Foundation is a not for profit foundation based in India. The focus of the foundation is to develop skill and competence primarily in areas of finance and risk management. The foundation runs many training programmes in these areas and also provides critical hand holding support to institutions that needs the same. These activities of the foundation are supported by various internal and external grants and donations that reduces the cost of these supports. These supports are primarily available to organisations located in South Asian region.

The foundation also provides scholarships to select needy students to enable them to acquire critical skill set. It also subsidises various research projects in the area of risk management. The foundation is accredited by NASBA as CPE sponsor.

Head office of the foundation is in Kolkata, India and its activities are spread in the Middle east, South East Asia, and Europe.

Non-profit organisations based in India